Igor Barukčić (born 5 April 1982 in Zagreb) is a Croatian retired footballer who last played for NK Klas Mičevac.

Barukčić had a spell in the German 2. Bundesliga with Eintracht Braunschweig during the 2006–07 season.

References

External links
 

1982 births
Living people
Footballers from Zagreb
Association football midfielders
Croatian footballers
NK Hrvatski Dragovoljac players
NK Croatia Sesvete players
NK Istra 1961 players
Eintracht Braunschweig players
HNK Gorica players
Croatian Football League players
2. Bundesliga players
First Football League (Croatia) players
Croatian expatriate footballers
Expatriate footballers in Germany
Croatian expatriate sportspeople in Germany